The Malaspina circumnavigation expedition was an interdisciplinary research project to assess the impact of global change on the oceans and explore their biodiversity. The 250 scientists on board the Hespérides and Sarmiento de Gamboa embarked on an eight-month expedition (starting in December 2010)  scientific research with training for young researchers - advancing marine science and fostering the public understanding of science.

The project was under the umbrella of the Spanish Ministry of Science and Innovation's Consolider – Ingenio 2010 programme and was led by the Spanish National Research Council (CSIC) with the support of the Spanish Navy. It is named after the original scientific Malaspina Expedition between 1789 and 1794, that was commanded by Alejandro Malaspina. Due to Malaspina's involvement in a conspiracy to overthrow the Spanish government, he was jailed upon his return and a large part of the expedition's reports and collections were put away unpublished, not to see the light again until late in the 20th century.

Objectives

Assessing the impact of global change on the oceans 

Global change relates to the impact of human activities on the functioning of the biosphere. These include activities which, although performed locally, have effects on the functioning of the earth's system as a whole.

produced by human activity.

The project will put together Colección Malaspina 2010, a collection of environmental and biological data and samples which will be available to the scientific community for it to evaluate the impacts of future global changes. This will be particularly valuable, for example, when new technologies allow levels of pollutants below current thresholds of detection to be evaluated.

Exploring the biodiversity of the deep ocean 

Half the Earth's surface is covered by oceans over 3,000 metres deep, making them the biggest ecosystem on the planet. Nevertheless, due to the limitations of the technology available until just recently, the oceans remain something of a mystery. Indeed, it is often said that we know more about the Moon or Mars than Earth's oceans.

The development of new genomic techniques has now made it possible to explore life's diversity in the sunless depths of the oceans and assess the metabolic potential of the life they conceal. Exploring biodiversity in the ocean's depths could also yield important discoveries with applications in biotechnology.

Assessing the impact of the original Malaspina expedition 

Using sources in the countries visited, the project also aims to assess the socio-political impact of the Malaspina expedition in the regions it explored, and review the biography and historiography of Alejandro Malaspina, with particular emphasis on the work done in the wake of the expedition.

Promoting marine science in Spain and public understanding of issues in marine sciences 

Spain has played a leading role in the exploration of the planet's resources, and remains a benchmark in international oceanographic research. The project aims to foster platforms for cooperation within the marine research community in Spain, and to bring science and research on global change closer to the public through various outreach activities, such as exhibitions, lecture series, etc.

Raising the interest for marine sciences within the youth and training young scientists in a global perspective to ocean sciences 

The project will be a unique opportunity to promote the training of young researchers in marine sciences. Four postgraduate
programmes have jointly coordinated a training module, included in the FBBVA-CSIC's Malaspina Expedition Doctoral Programme, financed by the BBVA Foundation and the CSIC. The high point of this training module will be the use of the Sarmiento de Gamboa as a teaching vessel on the leg of the journey between Miami and Las Palmas.

Research blocks 

The expedition's research work is subdivided into 11 blocks:

Thematic blocks 

 Physical oceanography: changes in the physical properties of the ocean
 Ocean biochemistry: carbon, nutrients and trace gases
 Atmospheric deposition and organic pollutants
 Optics, phytoplankton, production and metabolism
 Microbiological diversity and ecological function
 The distribution and role of zooplankton in the world's oceans
 The Malaspina expedition. Science and politics on the other side of the ocean

Horizontal blocks 

 Coordination
 Science and society
 Training
 Integration

Route taken by the expedition 

The Malaspina expedition, taking place between December 2010 and July 2011, will involve two oceanographic research vessels: The Hespérides, operated by the Spanish Navy, which will circumnavigate the globe, and the R/V Sarmiento de Gamboa, operated by the  Marine Technology Unit from the CSIC, which will sail from Cadiz to Santo Domingo (Dominican Republic) and then return to Cadiz, where it will host a ‘floating
university’ providing oceanographic training for a group of master's degree students.

Route of the Hesperides 

 Cartagena - Cadiz
 Cadiz - Río de Janeiro
 Rio de Janeiro - Cape Town
 Cape Town - Perth
 Perth - Sydney
 Sydney - Auckland
 Auckland - Honolulu
 Honolulu - Cartagena de Indias
 Cartagena de Indias - Cádiz

References

External links 
 Circumnavigation expedition Malaspina. Global change and exploration of the ocean's biodiversity
 Viento en popa a toda ciencia
 Spanish National Research Council (CSIC)
 de Ciencia e Innovación de España (MICINN)
 2010 programme
 Spanish Navy 

2010 in Spain
2011 in Spain
Oceanography
Oceanographic expeditions
Science and technology in Spain
Expeditions from Spain